John Boylan may refer to:

 John Boylan (American actor) (1912–1994), American film, television and stage actor
 John Boylan (Canadian actor), Canadian film and television actor
 John Boylan (record producer) (born 1941), American music producer and songwriter
 John H. Boylan (1907–1981), Vermont politician
 John J. Boylan (1878–1938), US Congressman
 John Joseph Boylan (bishop) (1889–1953), third Roman Catholic Bishop of Rockford, Illinois

See also
 John Boylen (1898–1961), Scottish footballer